Trieste was the name of at least two ships of the Italian Navy and may refer to:

 , a  launched in 1926 and sunk in 1943.
 , a landing helicopter dock ship launched in 2019

Italian Navy ship names